The women's team soft tennis event was part of the soft tennis programme and took place on October 3 and 4, at the Yeorumul Tennis Courts.

Schedule
All times are Korea Standard Time (UTC+09:00)

Results

Preliminary round

Group A

Group B

Knockout round

Semifinals

Final

References 

Official website

External links 
soft-tennis.org

Soft tennis at the 2014 Asian Games